"Give You All My Love" is a song by American singer Stacey Q. It was released on May 25, 1989 as the lead single from her third studio album, Nights Like This, in 1989 by Atlantic Records. Written by Stacey Swain and David Cole and produced by Cole and Robert Clivillés, "Give You All My Love" is primarily a dance-pop song. Two versions of the song were released, the album version that appears on Nights Like This and the Crossover house mix.

The song noted a small commercial success, peaking at number sixteen on the Billboard Hot Dance Club Songs chart.

Track listings 
US 7" vinyl
 "Give You All My Love" – 4:28
 "Out of My Heart" – 3:49

US 12" vinyl
 "Give You All My Love" (Crossover House Mix) – 5:47
 "Give You All My Love" (Crossover Club Mix) – 4:33
 "Give You All My Love" (Underground Mix) – 4:41
 "Give You All My Love" (Radio Edit) – 3:32

Credits and personnel 
Stacey Q – vocals, songwriter
David Cole – songwriter, producer, mixing, arrangement
Robert Clivillés – producer, mixing, arrangement
Ken Komisar – executive producer
Jocelyn Brown – background vocals
Martha Wash – background vocals
Craig Derry – background vocals
Steve Griffin – engineer
Bruce Miller – engineer

References 

1989 singles
1989 songs
Stacey Q songs
Dance-pop songs
House music songs
Songs written by David Cole (record producer)
Atlantic Records singles
Song recordings produced by Robert Clivillés